Rieger and de Reiger are surnames. Notable people with the surname include:

August Rieger
Bernhard Rieger, German Prelate of the Roman Catholic Church
Durhane Wong-Rieger, Canadian physician
Erich Rieger, German astrophysicist
František Ladislav Rieger, Czech politician and leader of nationalist movement
Fritz Rieger, German conductor
Gottfried Rieger (1764–1855), Austrian composer
James E. Rieger, American lawyer and US Army officer
Janusz Rieger, Polish linguist
Joerg Rieger (born 1963), American professor
Jürgen Rieger, German lawyer and Holocaust denier
Ladislav Svante Rieger, Czech mathematician
Max Rieger (born 1946), German alpine skier
Nicole Rieger, German pole-vaulter
Sabine Günther née Rieger, East German athlete
Silvia Rieger, German athlete

See also 
 De Reiger, a smock mill in Nijetrijne, Friesland, Netherlands
 De Dans van de Reiger, a 1966 Dutch film 
 Rieger Orgelbau, Austrian organ-building firm
 Rieger–Kloss, Czech organ-building firm
 Rieger Tuning, automobile tuning specialist and bodykit manufacturer

German-language surnames